Jakub Szmatuła (born 22 March 1981) is a Polish former professional footballer who played as a goalkeeper. He currently serves as a goalkeeping coach for Piast Gliwice.

Honours

Club

Piast Gliwice
Ekstraklasa: 2018–19

References

External links
 
 

1981 births
Living people
Footballers from Poznań
Polish footballers
Association football goalkeepers
Ekstraklasa players
I liga players
II liga players
III liga players
Czarni Żagań players
Aluminium Konin players
Wigry Suwałki players
Lech Poznań players
Zagłębie Lubin players
KS Polkowice players
Warta Poznań players
Piast Gliwice players
Górnik Zabrze players